Meet the Peetes is an American reality television series starring Holly Robinson Peete, Rodney Peete, their four children, and her mother, Dolores. The series is Hallmark Channel's first entry into unscripted reality television.  The Peete family had previously starred in For Peete's Sake for two seasons (2016–2017) on the Oprah Winfrey Network.

The series premiered on February 18, 2018, as part of Hallmark Channel's Sunday-night programming. On March 21, 2018, Hallmark announced the show's renewal for a second season. Amid other Sunday-night programming changes, Meet the Peetes moved to Monday nights in season two beginning with episode four on March 18, 2019. Cancellation of the series was announced in May 2019.

Cast
Holly Robinson Peete, actress, singer, and mother
Rodney Peete, husband, father, and former NFL football player
Dolores Robinson, Holly's octogenarian mother
Ryan Elizabeth Peete, daughter and NYU student, twin of Rodney
Rodney "R.J." Peete Jr, son and Los Angeles Dodgers employee whose autism is frequently featured in the series
Robinson James Peete, son
Roman Matthew Peete, son

Episodes

Season 1 (2018)

Hallmark Channel aired a Meet the Peetes Christmas Special program on December 3, 2018, which had 553 thousand U.S. viewers.

Season 2 (2019)

Production
The series was produced by Tremendous! Entertainment and had as its executive producers: Colleen Needles Steward, Shannon Keenan Demers, Holly Robinson Peete, Rodney Peete, Heidi Dahmen, and Kyell Thomas.

References

External links

2010s American black television series
2010s American reality television series
2018 American television series debuts
2019 American television series endings
English-language television shows
Hallmark Channel original programming
Television series about families